Dooling Creek is a stream in Osage County of central Missouri. It is a tributary of the Missouri River.

Variant names were "Doolings Creek" and "Doolins Creek". The creek derives its name from the local Doolin family.

See also
List of rivers of Missouri

References

Rivers of Osage County, Missouri
Rivers of Missouri